Water polo was contested for men only at the 1994 Asian Games at the Hiroshima Big Wave Pool, Hiroshima, Japan from 11 October to 15 October 1994.

Kazakhstan won the gold medal with a perfect record in its debut at the Asian Games, China finished second and Japan won the bronze medal in round robin competition.

Schedule

Medalists

Results
All times are Japan Standard Time (UTC+09:00)

Final standing

References
 Asian Games water polo medalists

External links
 Results

 
1994 Asian Games events
1994
Asian Games
1994 Asian Games